Krakės is a village in Kėdainiai district municipality, in Kaunas County, in central Lithuania. According to the 2011 census, the village had a population of 32 people. It is located all around Krakės town, scattered by the roads from Krakės to Bokštai, Kėdainiai and Grinkiškis. At the eastern side, nearby the Krakės-Dotnuva Forest there is old Jewish cemetery of the Krakės Jews.

At the beginning of the 20th century there was Žydkapiai ('Jewish graves') village nearby Krakės town.

Demography

References

Villages in Kaunas County
Kėdainiai District Municipality